The 2008–09 Ohio State Buckeyes men's basketball team represented Ohio State University. The head coach was Thad Matta, then in his fifth season with the Buckeyes. The team played its home games in Jerome Schottenstein Center in Columbus, Ohio as a member of the Big Ten Conference.  The Buckeyes finished fourth in the conference's regular season, and was runner up in the Big Ten tournament, falling to Purdue 65–61 in the final game.  In the NCAA tournament, the Buckeyes lost in the first round to the Siena Saints in double overtime.

Roster

Source

2008–09 Schedule 

|-
!colspan=12 style=|Regular Season

|-

|-

|-

|-

|-

|-

|-

|-

|-

|-

|-

|-

|-

|-

|-

|-

|-

|-

|-

|-

|-

|-

|-

|-

|-

|-

|-

|-

|-
!colspan=12 style=|Big Ten tournament 

|-
!colspan=12 style=|NCAA Tournament

Rankings

References

Ohio State
Ohio State Buckeyes men's basketball seasons
Ohio State
Ohio State Buckeyes
Ohio State Buckeyes